Pierre-Paul Durieu  (December 4, 1830 – June 1, 1899), was a Roman Catholic missionary and the first Bishop of New Westminster, in British Columbia, Canada.

Life
Durieu was born in 1830 in Saint-Pal-de-Mons, the second son of Blaise Durieux and Mariette Bayle, a farming family who had sheltered the clergy during the French Revolution. As a boy, both he and his brother were allowed to study at the local minor seminary at Monistrol-sur-Loire. Pierre-Paul felt called to serve in the foreign missions and entered the novitiate of the Missionary Oblates of Mary Immaculate at Notre-Dame-de-l'Osier on 31 October 1848. He professed religious vows on 1 November of the following year. After that, he did his studies in preparation for Holy Orders at the Oblate seminary in Marseilles.

In 1854 Durieu was ordained as a priest by Eugène de Mazenod, the founder of his religious congregation, and, after being sent for further training in English and theology, was sent to join the Oregon Missions, where he was assigned to serve at St. Mary's Mission in the Yakima Valley and the Okanagan area of British Columbia. In 1875, Paul Durieu was consecrated as the coadjutor bishop for the Vicariate Apostolic of British Columbia by Louis-Joseph d'Herbomez, the Vicar Apostolic. Upon his death, Durieu became Vicar Apostolic, and later the first Bishop of New Westminster (which later became the Archdiocese of Vancouver).

During his tenure, Durieu commanded the First Nations people of British Columbia to obey four directives: discontinue performing native dances; cease the practice of potlach; cease consulting shamans; and to abstain from drinking and gambling. He wrote a book of biblical stories in Chinook Jargon in order to teach the Catholic faith to the native peoples under his care, and set up mission centers where they could keep their nomadic traditions but be reached by the missionaries. He attempted to secure treaties with the Canadian government to protect the rights of the peoples of the First Nations against the growing encroachments of the white settlers, to no avail.

Durieu died in 1899 and was buried alongside his predecessor at St. Mary's Mission.

The farming community of Durieu, northeast of Mission, B.C., is named after him.

References
 
"Former Bishops". Archdiocese of Vancouver. Retrieved March 2, 2013.
"Bishop Pierre-Paul Durieu, O.M.I.". Catholic Hierarchy. Retrieved March 2, 2013.

External links
 

1830 births
1899 deaths
People from Haute-Loire
French Roman Catholic missionaries
Roman Catholic bishops of New Westminster
19th-century Roman Catholic bishops in Canada
Franco-Columbian people
Missionary Oblates of Mary Immaculate
Translators to Chinookan
French emigrants to pre-Confederation British Columbia
19th-century translators
Roman Catholic missionaries in Canada
French expatriates in Canada
Missionary linguists